Scardinius racovitzai is a species of ray-finned fish in the family Cyprinidae.
It is found only in Romania.

Sources

Scardinius
Fish described in 1958
Taxonomy articles created by Polbot